Sharon Ann Tredrea (born 30 June 1954) is a former Australian cricketer who played ten Women's Test matches and 31 Women's One Day Internationals including the 1973 Women's Cricket World Cup in England, 1978 Women's Cricket World Cup in India, and the 1988 Women's Cricket World Cup as vice-captain in her home country. In 1983, she was considered the fastest female bowler in the world. Her final WODI appearance was in the final of the 1988 Women's Cricket World Cup.

In 2020 she was inducted into the Australian Cricket Hall of Fame. The best player for the Victorian Spirit is now awarded the Sharon Tredrea Award.

Sharon Tredrea is the sister of Janette Tredrea, who played five tests and five one day internationals for Australia. She is the sister of Gary Tredrea.

Sharon Tredrea was inducted into the Australian Cricket’s Hall of Fame in 2020.  Sharon is the fifth woman and third Captain to be so honoured.

References

Notes

Further reading

External links
 
 Sharon Ann Tredrea at CricketArchive
 Sharon Tredrea at southernstars.org.au

1954 births
Australia women One Day International cricketers
Australia women Test cricketers
Cricketers from Melbourne
Living people
Victoria women cricketers